Centro Sociale Leoncavallo is a self-managed social centre in Milan, Italy, which exists since a former factory on via Leoncavallo was squatted in 1975. It was evicted and partially demolished in 1989, then quickly reoccupied and rebuilt. It was evicted again in 1994 and briefly moved to a warehouse for six months before occupying its still extant location on via Antoine Watteau. Activities include concerts, theatre, debates, exhibitions and a radio station. The centre describes itself as Leoncavallo Self-Managed Public Space (Italian: Leoncavallo Spazio Pubblico Autogestito).

History 

The Leoncavallo social centre was first occupied in 1975. The former Scotti pharmaceutical factory (3,600m²) was on Leoncavallo Street in the northeast of the city. In 1989, the mayor of Milan decided to evict the building's residents in accordance with the wishes of the owner and it was then partially demolished. A few days after the eviction, Leoncavallo was reoccupied and rebuilt by hand.

Rightwing politicians campaigned against the centre in 1994, and it was again evicted. A warehouse on via Salomone was occupied for some months and then a new zone (a former printers) was squatted on via Antoine Watteau, close to the first site. It was 10,000m², with courtyards set around buildings and a central square. Le Monde diplomatique stated that in the late 1990s, Matteo Salvini, who was at that time a city councillor, drank beer and attended events at the centre, defending it against attacks by the mayor, Marco Formentini. However, a detailed investigation by Jacobin concluded that Salvini had claimed affinity at one point for political gain but most likely was not a regular visitor.

Eventually, the city decided against eviction and the owners did not request it, since they were hoping to be paid rent. By 2000, no agreement had been reached between the parties, and the following year a representative of the centre was elected to the city council as a member of the Communist Party (Rifondazione Comunista). In 2004, the Leoncavallo Foundation was set up to continue negotiations.

Activities 

Activities at the vast centre include musical concerts, theatre shows, debates, language courses, workshops, art exhibitions and 
a radio station. Leoncavallo is also a hub for street art. Since 1995, free food and accommodation is provided for whoever needs it. As of 2003, 80 people were working at the centre, half as volunteers, half receiving "solidarity tokens" for their time. The centre is self-financing, generating the money it needs for upkeep from benefit concerts and bar takings. For ideological reasons, the centre refuses to pay taxes. 

When Naomi Klein visited Leoncavallo in 2001, she described it as "practically a self-contained city, with several restaurants, gardens, a bookstore, a cinema, an indoor skateboard ramp, and a club so large it was able to host Public Enemy when they came to town." The still-extant centre defined itself in 2019 as Leoncavallo Self-Managed Public Space (Italian: Leoncavallo Spazio Pubblico Autogestito).

See also 
 Forte Prenestino

References 

Squats in Italy
1975 establishments in Italy
Buildings and structures in Milan
Music venues in Italy
Infoshops